Semir Bajraktarević (born 14 October 1987) is a Bosnian professional footballer who plays as an attacking midfielder for Bosnian Premier League club Olimpik.

Notes

References

External links
Semir Bajraktarević at Sofascore

1987 births
Living people
Footballers from Sarajevo
Association football midfielders
Bosnia and Herzegovina footballers
NK SAŠK Napredak players
FK Sarajevo players
NK Čelik Zenica players
FK Sloboda Tuzla players
Ironi Nesher F.C. players
Hapoel Petah Tikva F.C. players
Hapoel Hadera F.C. players
Maccabi Ahi Nazareth F.C. players
Flamurtari Vlorë players
FK Olimpik players
First League of the Federation of Bosnia and Herzegovina players
Premier League of Bosnia and Herzegovina players
Liga Leumit players
Kategoria Superiore players
Bosnia and Herzegovina expatriate footballers
Expatriate footballers in Israel
Bosnia and Herzegovina expatriate sportspeople in Israel
Expatriate footballers in Albania
Bosnia and Herzegovina expatriate sportspeople in Albania